Émilienne Léontine Morin (28 October 1901 – 14 February 1991) was a French anarcho-syndicalist, shorthand typist and partner of Buenaventura Durruti. In 1936, she was part of the Durruti column, an anarchist military unit, during the Spanish Civil war. She was nicknamed "Mimi-FAI" after the Federación Anarquista Ibérica (FAI).

Early life 
Émilienne Clemence Léontine Morin was born on 28 October 1901 in Angers, Maine-et-Loire, France, the daughter of Léontine Ernestine Giroux, a factory worker, and Étienne Morin, an anarcho-syndicalist activist in the Building Workers' Union. Her parents married 19 December 1904. Morin was involved in revolutionary circles from a very young age and was active in 15th arrondissement group of the Jeunesses syndicalistes and in 1923 was a member of their Bureau.

In 1916, she was the secretary of the pacifist and anti-militarist newspaper Ce qu'il faut dire, founded by Sébastien Faure and Mauricius to oppose the Manifesto of the Sixteen.

In 1924, she married the Italian libertarian activist Mario Cascari, (also known as Cesario Tafani and Oscar Barodi) in Yerres, although they soon divorced.

On 14 July 1927, Morin met Spanish anarchist Buenaventura Durruti at the Librairie internationale anarchiste (International Anarchist Bookshop) in Paris. They became life partners until his death. On the same day, her friend Berthe Fabert also met her future life partner, Francisco Ascaso, at the bookshop.

Brussels 
In July 1927, Durruti was expelled from France into Belgium and Morin gave up her job as a shorthand typist to join him in Brussels where many Spanish anarchists were living below the radar. She met Juan Manuel Molina Mateo and Lola Iturbe, co-founder of the libertarian women's organisation Mujeres Libres there at the beginning of 1928. Iturbe described her as " a very pleasant young woman, with a fair complexion and blue eyes, with her hair cut in a boyish style. Her energetic character, ideological convictions and oratory skills were evident in the public controversies - especially with the communists - that took place in the Maison du Peuple in Brussels."

Morin and Durutti led a difficult life in Belgium. She sometimes worked while he was unemployed and took care of the household chores.

Spain 
In 1931, the couple travelled to Spain where the Second Spanish Republic had just been proclaimed. Morin took part in the activities of the Confederación Nacional del Trabajo, and worked on their publications.

On 4 December 1931, their daughter Colette Durruti was born in Barcelona. Given Durutti's many absences and imprisonments, Morin brought her up virtually single-handedly, with the help of an anarchist friend, Teresa Margaleff, who sometimes acted as a nanny whilst Morin worked as an usherette at the Goya Theatre. From her arrival in Spain, Morin sent regular articles on "Choses d’Espagne" to the French anarchist newspaper Le Libertaire.

During the Spanish Revolution of 1936, Morin joined the Durruti Column on the Aragon front. As early as August, she was among the administrators of the Column's headquarters, where she was in charge of the press office.

On 20 November 1936 Buenaventura Durruti was killed on the Madrid front. Morin attended his huge funeral on 23 November.

Return to France 
Morin and her daughter returned to France in 1937, setting up home at 5 Villa Stendhal in Paris, and she campaigned, by word and deed, for the Spanish revolutionaries. On 27 May 1937, she was one of the speakers - along with Haussard, Sébastien Faure, Fidel Miro, Bernardo Pou and Cortes - at the large support meeting held by the Union Anarchiste at the Salle de la Mutualité in Paris, attended by about 4,000 people.

Four large rooms at 28 Boulevard Saint Denis were rented in her name in September 1937 as an office for the publication La Nouvelle Espagne antifasciste/La Nueva España antifascista, whose editor was Nemesio Galve, who defended the official line of the Confederación Nacional del Trabajo and Federación Anarquista Ibérica.

On 22 November 1938 she chaired a meeting to commemorate Durutti held at the Salle de la Mutualité by the Union Anarchiste, where E. Frémont, Suzanne Levy, P. Herrera and Chazoff.

Morin collaborated with the Solidaridad Internacional Antifascista (SIA) organisation run by Louis Lecoin and Nicolas Faucier, particularly to collect funds and aid for Spanish refugees interned in camps in the south of France. In July 1938 she published her memories of the Front in the newspaper Le Libertaire, the publication of the Union Anarchiste.

Later life 
After the war, she kept close links with many Spanish libertarian refugees.

Émilienne Morin later retired to Quimper and died there in l'Hospital de Cornouaille on 14 February 1991.

Bibliography 

 Hans Magnus Enzensberger, Le Bref été de l'Anarchie - la vie et la mort de Buenaventura Durruti, biographie traduite de l'allemand par Lily Jumel, éditions Gallimard, 1975, réédition 2010, (it) lire en ligne.
 (en) Abel Paz, Durruti in the Spanish Revolution, AK Press, 2007, lire en ligne.

References

Further reading 
 Histoire de l'anarchisme

1901 births
1991 deaths
Confederación Nacional del Trabajo members
French anarchists
French anarchist resistance in World War II
International Brigades personnel
French feminists
People from Angers
Anarcho-communists
Anarchist partisans
Anarcho-syndicalists
Anarchist writers